Nigel Read is a retired lightweight rower who competed for Great Britain.

Rowing career
Read was part of the lightweight eight that secured a bronze medal at the 1975 World Rowing Championships. The following year he was part of the lightweight eight that secured a silver medal at the 1976 World Rowing Championships in Villach, Austria. He won a gold medal at the 1977 World Rowing Championships in Amsterdam with the lightweight men's eight. The following year he was part of the lightweight eight that successfully defended their title and won the gold medal at the 1978 FISA Lightweight Championships in Copenhagen. He regained the title and gold medal at the World Championships in Hazewinkel, August 1980

References

Year of birth missing (living people)
British male rowers
World Rowing Championships medalists for Great Britain
Living people